Ilayum Mullum, also known as Leaves and Thorns, is a 1994 Indian Malayalam film, directed by K. P. Sasi, starring Thilakan and Pallavi Joshi in the lead roles.

Cast
 Pallavi Joshi as Shantha (Voice By Kukku Parameshwaran)
 Shanthi Krishna as Parvathy (Voice by Aanandavally)
 Kanya	as Lakshmi (Voice by Suma Sakriya)
 Sabnam as Sridevi	
 Thilakan
 Nedumudi Venu
 Shammi Thilakan
 Baiju Santhosh

Participation in film festivals
Ilayum Mullum has been screened in the following festivals:

 Venice International Film Festival Critics Week
 Montreal World Film Festival
 Toronto Film Festival
 Sydney Film Festival
 Nantes Festival of Three Continents
 Fribourg International Film Festival
 Cairo International Film Festival
 Izmir International Film Festival (Turkey)
 Cape Town International Film Festival
 Munich International Film Festival
 International Film Festival of India
 Indian Panorama
 International Festival of Rural Films, France

Awards
Ilayum Mullum won the Prix du Jury award for Best Film, Prix des Lyceens.

References

External links

1994 films
1990s Malayalam-language films
Films shot in Kollam